Acidulated water is water where some sort of acids is added—often lemon juice, lime juice, or vinegar—to prevent cut or skinned fruits or vegetables from browning so as to maintain their appearance. Some vegetables and fruits often placed in acidulated water are apples, avocados, celeriac, potatoes and pears. When the fruit or vegetable is removed from the mixture, it will usually resist browning for at least an hour or two, even though it is being exposed to oxygen.

An added benefit of placing items in acidulated water is that the food item acquires a taste of the acid used, which can be very pleasant on the palate.

Acidulated water, most often made with the use of vinegar, can be used on an aged, hanging beef carcass (butchered) to help clean it.  The hanging primals / sub-primals can be wiped down with a cloth that has been submerged in the acidulated solution to help remove the "slick" surface that can build up during the aging process.

See also

References

External links 
 Acidulated Water - Kitchen Dictionary - Food.com

Preservatives